Emmaboda IS is a sports club in Emmaboda, Sweden, established in 1927.

The men's soccer team has played three seasons in the Swedish second division.

References

External links
Official website 

1927 establishments in Sweden
Association football clubs established in 1927
Football clubs in Kalmar County